Arthur Leslie Morton (4 July 1903 – 23 October 1987) was an English Marxist historian. He worked as an independent scholar; from 1946 onwards he was the Chair of the Historians Group of the Communist Party of Great Britain (CPGB). He is best known for A People's History of England, but he also did valuable work on William Blake and the Ranters, and for the study The English Utopia.

Life
Morton was born in Suffolk, the son of a Yorkshire farmer. He had two siblings, a sister Kathleen and a brother Max. He attended school in Bury until he was 16 and then at boarding school in Eastbourne. He then studied the English tripos at Peterhouse, Cambridge, from 1921 to 1924, graduating with a third-class degree. While at Cambridge, he developed friends around the Labour group, including Allen Hutt who became a typographer and Ivor Montagu who was later active in the film industry. He encountered socialist ideas, moving towards the communist group at the university around Maurice Dobb.

After college he taught at Steyning Grammar School in Sussex, where under his influence, most of the staff supported the General Strike in 1926. Dismissed as a consequence, he taught for a year at A.S. Neill's progressive school, Summerhill at that time in Lyme Regis. He then moved to London to write and run a bookshop in Finsbury Circus. In 1929 he joined the Communist Party of Great Britain and along with his wife, Vivien, remained a member for the rest of his life. Vivien was the daughter of the socialist Thomas A. Jackson.

Morton belonged to a group of London left-wing intellectuals of the 1930s, while working as a journalist for the Daily Worker. He served on the editorial board of the paper. His friends at that time included A.L. Lloyd and Maurice Cornforth; he assisted Victor B. Neuburg. In 1932 and 1933, he was involved in a debate with F. R. Leavis, in the pages of Scrutiny. He participated in the Hunger marches of 1934.

His 1938 A People's History of England,  published by the Left Book Club, was adopted quasi-officially as the CPGB national history, and later editions were issued on that basis.

During the early part of the Second World War, he was the full-time district organiser of the Communist Party's East Anglia district and became chair of the district committee for many years.

Morton spent most of the 1939–45 World War in the Royal Artillery labouring on construction sites in the Isle of Sheppey.

He was part of the group of leading communist historians invited to Moscow in 1954/5, with Christopher Hill, Eric Hobsbawm, and the Byzantine historian Robert Browning. Morton was a founding member of the William Morris Society in 1955. He participated in the People's March for Jobs in the early 1980s, a demonstration of 500 anti-unemployment protesters who marched to London from Northern England.

Morton died in 1987 at his home in The Old Chapel at Clare in Suffolk, aged 84.

Library
A.L. Morton bequeathed his library to the university library of Rostock University in Rostock, Mecklenburg-Vorpommern, Germany (which was then in the German Democratic Republic and named Wilhelm-Pieck-University after the GDR's first and only president, Wilhelm Pieck). The collection comprises more than 3,900 volumes, including all foreign-language editions of A People's History of England, many contain hand-written comments by Morton.

Works

A People's History Of England (1938)
Language of Men (1945) essays
The story of the English revolution (1949), Communist Party pamphlet
The English Utopia (1952)
The British Labour Movement, 1770-1920 (1956) with George Tate
The Everlasting Gospel: A Study in the Sources of William Blake (1958)
The Life and Ideas of Robert Owen (1962)
The Matter of Britain: Essays in a Living Culture (1966)
The World of the Ranters: Religious Radicalism in the English Revolution (1970)
Political Writings of William Morris (1973) editor
Freedom in Arms: A Selection of Leveller Writings (1975) editor
Collected poems (1976)
Three Works By William Morris (1977) editor
History and the Imagination: Selected Writings of A.L. Morton (1990) edited by Margot Heinemann and Willie Thompson

References
Notes

Bibliography
 Calladine, Amy (May 30, 2010) "History from Below" New Histories v.1, n.7
Cornforth, Maurice ed. (Winter 1980/81)) Rebels & Their Causes: Essays in Honour of A. L. Morton Science & Society v.44, n.4, pp. 501–503
 Simkin, John (September 1997) "A. L. Morton" Spartacus Educational

Further reading
 Heinemann, Margot and Thompson, Willie eds.(1990) History and the Imagination: Selected Writings of A.L. Morton/ London: Lawrence & Wishart. 
 Hogsbjerg, Christian (2020) "A.L. Morton and the Poetics of People's History", Socialist History, v.58

External links
 AL Morton archive at Marxists.org
 A. L. Morton's Library in the Catalogue of Rostock University Library

1903 births
1987 deaths
Alumni of Peterhouse, Cambridge
British communists
British male journalists
British Marxists
Communist Party of Great Britain members
Communist Party Historians Group members
Marxist journalists
20th-century British historians